34 Combat Engineer Regiment (34CER) is a reserve unit of the Royal Canadian Engineers in Montreal, and Rouyn-Noranda, Quebec, Canada. It is part of the 34 Canadian Brigade Group, 2nd Canadian Division.

The unit currently consists of:

 4 Field Engineer Squadron (French: 4e Escadron du génie)
 9 Field Engineer Squadron (French: 9e Escadron du génie)
 Command and Support Squadron

See also

 Military history of Canada
 History of the Canadian Army
 Canadian Forces
 List of armouries in Canada

References

Engineer regiments of Canada
Westmount, Quebec